Emma Ramírez Gorgoso (born 10 May 2002) is a Spanish professional footballer who plays as a centre back for Liga F club FC Barcelona.

Club career
Ramírez started her career at Espanyol.

References

External links
 Emma Ramírez at FC Barcelona
 Emma Ramírez at Real Sociedad
 
 
 

2002 births
Living people
Women's association football defenders
Spanish women's footballers
People from Cornellà de Llobregat
Sportspeople from the Province of Barcelona
Footballers from Catalonia
FC Barcelona Femení players
Real Sociedad (women) players
Primera División (women) players
RCD Espanyol Femenino players
Segunda Federación (women) players
FC Barcelona Femení B players
Sportswomen from Catalonia